Geobios is an academic journal published bimonthly by the publishing house Elsevier. Geobios is an international journal of paleontology, focusing on the areas of palaeobiology, palaeoecology, palaeobiogeography, stratigraphy and biogeochemistry.

Geobios is indexed and abstracted in: Science Citation Index, ISI, Bulletin signalétique, PASCAL, Geo Abstracts, Biological Abstracts, The Geoscience Database, Referativnyi Zhurnal, SciSearch, Research Alert and Current Contents/Physical, Chemical & Earth Sciences.

Description
Articles are published only in English, following a standard peer-review process (usually involving 3 reviewers) supervised by an associate-editor through the Journal's submission web site. Articles are published in a printed (paper) format as well as in electronic format on the Geobios ScienceDirect web site. All taxonomic groups are treated, including microfossils, invertebrates, plants, vertebrates and ichnofossils.

Geobios welcomes descriptive papers based on original material (e.g. large Systematic Paleontology works), as well as more analytically and/or methodologically-oriented papers, provided they offer strong and significant biochronological/biostratigraphical, paleobiogeographical, paleobiological and/or phylogenetic new insights and perspectives. A high priority level is given to synchronic and/or diachronic studies based on multi- or inter-disciplinary approaches mixing various fields of Earth and Life Sciences. Works based on extant data are also considered, provided they offer significant insights into geological-time studies.

History
Geobios was first published in 1968. Up to 2011, the Associate-Editors' board has been exclusively based in Lyon (France), placed under the editorial responsibility of Louis David, André Schaaf, Patrick Racheboeuf, and Serge Legendre & Pierre Hantzpergue. Since 2009 the Editor in chief is Gilles Escarguel. Initially published by the University Claude Bernard Lyon 1, the journal is published since 2001 by Elsevier.

External links
 Geobios website

References

Paleontology journals
Elsevier academic journals
Publications established in 1968
Multilingual journals
Bimonthly journals